Entanglement distillation (also called entanglement purification) is the transformation of N copies of an arbitrary entangled state  into some number of approximately pure Bell pairs, using only local operations and classical communication.

Quantum entanglement distillation can in this way overcome the degenerative influence of noisy quantum channels by transforming previously shared less entangled pairs into a smaller number of maximally entangled pairs.

History
The limits for entanglement dilution and distillation are due to C. H. Bennett, H. Bernstein, S. Popescu, and B. Schumacher, who presented the first distillation protocols for pure states in 1996; entanglement distillation protocols for mixed states were introduced by Bennett, Brassard, Popescu, Schumacher, Smolin and Wootters the same year. Bennett, DiVincenzo, Smolin and Wootters established the connection to quantum error-correction in a ground-breaking paper published in August 1996, also in the journal of Physical Review, which has stimulated a lot of subsequent research.

Quantifying entanglement
A two qubit system can be written as a superposition of possible computational basis qubit states: , each with an associated complex coefficient :

As in the case of a single qubit, the probability of measuring a particular computational basis state  is the square of the modulus of  its amplitude, or associated coefficient, subject to the normalization condition .  The normalization condition guarantees that the sum of the probabilities add up to 1, meaning that upon measurement, one of the states will be observed. 

The Bell state is a particularly important example of a two qubit state: 

Bell states possess the property that measurement outcomes on the two qubits are correlated. As can be seen from the expression above, the two possible measurement outcomes are zero and one, both with probability of 50%. As a result, a measurement of the second qubit always gives the same result as the measurement of the first qubit.

Bell states can be used to quantify entanglement. Let m be the number of high-fidelity copies of a Bell state that can be produced using LOCC. The process of entanglement distillation aims to saturate this limiting ratio. The number of copies of a pure state that may be converted into a maximally entangled state is equal to the von Neumann entropy  of the state, which is an extension of the concept of classical entropy for quantum systems.

Motivation

Suppose that two parties, Alice and Bob, would like to communicate classical information over a noisy quantum channel. Either classical or quantum information can be transmitted over a quantum channel by encoding the information in a quantum state. With this knowledge, Alice encodes the classical information that she intends to send to Bob in a (quantum) product state, as a tensor product of reduced density matrices  where each  is diagonal and can only be used as a one time input for a particular channel .

The fidelity of the noisy quantum channel is a measure of how closely the output of a quantum channel resembles the input, and is therefore a measure of how well a quantum channel preserves information.

The problem that Alice and Bob now face is that quantum communication over large distances depends upon successful distribution of highly entangled quantum states, and due to unavoidable noise in quantum communication channels, the quality of entangled states generally decreases exponentially with channel length as a function of the fidelity of the channel. Entanglement distillation addresses this problem of maintaining a high degree of entanglement between distributed quantum states by transforming N copies of an arbitrary entangled state  into approximately  Bell pairs, using only local operations and classical communication. The objective is to share strongly correlated qubits between distant parties (Alice and Bob) in order to allow reliable quantum teleportation or quantum cryptography.

Entanglement concentration

Pure states

Let an entangled state  have a Schmidt decomposition:

where coefficients p(x) form a probability distribution, and thus are positive valued and sum to unity. The tensor product of this state is then,

Now, omitting all terms  which are not part of any sequence which is likely to occur with high probability, known as the typical set:  the new state is

And renormalizing,

Then the fidelity

The theorem of typical sequences then shows us that  is the probability that the given sequence is part of the typical set, and may be made arbitrarily close to 1 for sufficiently large m, and therefore the Schmidt coefficients of the renormalized Bell state  will be at most a factor  larger. Alice and Bob can now obtain a smaller set of n Bell states by performing LOCC on the state  with which they can overcome the noise of a quantum channel to communicate successfully.

Mixed states

Many techniques have been developed for doing entanglement distillation for mixed states, giving a lower bounds on the value of the distillable entanglement  for specific classes of states .

One common method involves Alice not using the noisy channel to transmit source states directly but instead  preparing a large number of Bell states, sending half of each Bell pair to Bob. Alice and Bob then perform entanglement distillation, producing  almost perfectly entangled states from the mixed entangled states  by performing local unitary operations and measurements on the shared entangled pairs, coordinating their actions through classical messages, and sacrificing some of the entangled pairs to increase the purity of the remaining ones. Alice can now prepare an  qubit state and teleport it to Bob using the  Bell pairs which they share with high fidelity. What Alice and Bob have then effectively accomplished is having simulated a noiseless quantum channel using a noisy one, with the aid of local actions and classical communication.

Let  be a general mixed state of two spin-1/2 particles which could have resulted from the transmission of an initially pure singlet state

through a noisy channel between Alice and Bob, which will be used to distill some pure entanglement. The fidelity of 

is a convenient expression of its purity relative to a perfect singlet.

The following protocol is then used:

Performing a random bilateral rotation on each shared pair, choosing a random SU(2) rotation independently for each pair and applying it locally to both members of the pair transforms the initial general two-spin mixed state M into a rotationally symmetric mixture of the singlet state  and the three triplet states  and :  The Werner state  has the same purity F as the initial mixed state M from which it was derived due to the singlet's invariance under bilateral rotations.
Each of the two pairs is then acted on by a unilateral rotation, which we can call , which has the effect of converting them from mainly  Werner states to mainly  states with a large component  of  while the components of the other three Bell states are equal.
The two impure  states are then acted on by a bilateral XOR, and afterwards the target pair is locally measured along the z axis. The unmeasured source pair is kept if the target pair's spins come out parallel as in the case of both inputs being true  states; and it is discarded otherwise.
If the source pair has not been discarded it is converted back to a predominantly  state by a unilateral  rotation, and made rotationally symmetric by a random bilateral rotation.

Repeating the outlined protocol above will distill Werner states whose purity may be chosen to be arbitrarily high  from a collection M of input mixed states of purity  but with a yield tending to zero in the limit . This method can then be combined with others to obtain an even higher yield.

Procrustean method

The Procrustean method of entanglement concentration can be used for as little as one partly entangled pair, being more efficient than the Schmidt projection method for entangling less than 5 pairs, and requires Alice and Bob to know the bias of the n pairs in advance. The method derives its name from Procrustes because it produces a perfectly entangled state by chopping off the extra probability associated with the larger term in the partial entanglement of the pure states:

This treatment corresponds to a POVM (positive-operator-valued measurement). To obtain a perfectly entangled state of two particles, Alice informs Bob of the result of her generalized measurement while Bob doesn't measure his particle at all but instead discards his if Alice discards hers.

Stabilizer protocol

The purpose of an  entanglement distillation protocol is to distill  pure ebits from  noisy ebits where . Two parties can then use the noiseless ebits for quantum communication protocols.

The two parties establish a set of shared noisy ebits in the following way. The sender Alice first prepares  Bell states  locally. She sends the second qubit of each pair over a noisy quantum channel to a receiver Bob. Let  be the state  rearranged so that all of Alice's qubits are on the left and all of Bob's qubits are on the right. The noisy quantum channel applies a Pauli error in the error set  to the set of  qubits sent over the channel.

A one-way stabilizer entanglement distillation protocol uses a stabilizer code for the distillation procedure. Suppose the stabilizer  for an  quantum error-correcting code has generators . The measurement projects  randomly onto one of the  subspaces. Each  commutes with the noisy operator  on Bob's side so that

The following important Bell-state matrix identity holds for an arbitrary matrix :

Then the above expression is equal to the following:

Therefore, each of Alice's projectors  projects Bob's qubits onto a subspace  corresponding to Alice's projected subspace . She sends her measurement results to Bob. Bob combines his measurements with Alice's to determine a syndrome for the error. He performs a recovery operation on his qubits to reverse the error. He restores his qubits . Alice and Bob both perform the decoding unitary corresponding to stabilizer  to convert their  logical ebits to  physical ebits.

Entanglement-assisted stabilizer code 

Luo and Devetak provided a straightforward extension of the above protocol (Luo and Devetak 2007). Their method converts an entanglement-assisted stabilizer code into an entanglement-assisted entanglement distillation protocol.

Luo and Devetak form an entanglement distillation protocol that has entanglement assistance from a few noiseless ebits. The crucial assumption for an entanglement-assisted entanglement distillation protocol is that Alice and Bob possess  noiseless ebits in addition to their  noisy ebits. The total state of the noisy and noiseless ebits is

where  is the  identity matrix acting on Alice's qubits and the noisy Pauli operator  affects Bob's first  qubits only. Thus the last  ebits are noiseless, and Alice and Bob have to correct for errors on the first  ebits only.

The protocol proceeds exactly as outlined in the previous section. The only difference is that Alice and Bob measure the generators in an entanglement-assisted stabilizer code. Each generator spans over  qubits where the last  qubits are noiseless.

We comment on the yield of this entanglement-assisted entanglement distillation protocol. An entanglement-assisted code has  generators that each have  Pauli entries. These parameters imply that the entanglement distillation protocol produces  ebits. But the protocol consumes  initial noiseless ebits as a catalyst for distillation.

Entanglement dilution

The reverse process of entanglement distillation is entanglement dilution, where large copies of the Bell state  are converted into less entangled states using LOCC with high fidelity. The aim of the entanglement dilution process, then, is to saturate the inverse ratio of n to m, defined as the distillable entanglement.

Applications

Besides its important application in quantum communication, entanglement purification also plays a crucial role in error correction for quantum computation, because it can significantly increase the quality of logic operations between different qubits. The role of entanglement distillation is discussed briefly for the following applications.

Quantum error correction

Entanglement distillation protocols for mixed states can be used as a type of error-correction for quantum communications channels between two parties Alice and Bob, enabling Alice to reliably send mD(p) qubits of information to Bob, where D(p) is the distillable entanglement of p, the state that results when one half of a Bell pair is sent through the noisy channel  connecting Alice and Bob.

In some cases, entanglement distillation may work when conventional quantum error-correction techniques fail. Entanglement distillation protocols are known which can produce a non-zero rate of transmission D(p) for channels which do not allow the transmission of quantum information due to the property that entanglement distillation protocols allow classical communication between parties as opposed to conventional  error-correction which prohibits it.

Quantum cryptography

The concept of correlated measurement outcomes and entanglement is central to quantum key exchange, and therefore the ability to successfully perform entanglement distillation to obtain maximally entangled states is essential for quantum cryptography.

If an entangled pair of particles is shared between two parties, anyone intercepting either particle will alter the overall system, allowing their presence (and the amount of information they have gained) to be determined so long as the particles are in a maximally entangled state. Also, in order to share a secret key string, Alice and Bob must perform the techniques of privacy amplification and information reconciliation to distill a shared secret key string. Information reconciliation is error-correction over a public channel which reconciles errors between the correlated random classical bit strings shared by Alice and Bob while limiting the knowledge that a possible eavesdropper Eve can have about the shared keys. After information reconciliation is used to reconcile possible errors between the shared keys that Alice and Bob possess and limit the possible information Eve could have gained, the technique of privacy amplification is used to distill a smaller subset of bits maximizing Eve's uncertainty about the key.

Quantum teleportation

In quantum teleportation, a sender wishes to transmit an arbitrary quantum state of a particle to a possibly distant receiver. Quantum teleportation is able to achieve faithful transmission of quantum information by substituting classical communication and prior entanglement for a direct quantum channel. Using teleportation, an arbitrary unknown qubit can be faithfully transmitted via a pair of maximally-entangled qubits shared between sender and receiver, and a 2-bit classical message from the sender to the receiver. Quantum teleportation requires a noiseless quantum channel for sharing perfectly entangled particles, and therefore entanglement distillation satisfies this requirement by providing the noiseless quantum channel and maximally entangled qubits.

See also
Quantum channel
Quantum cryptography
Quantum entanglement
Quantum state
Quantum teleportation
LOCC
Purification theorem

Notes and references

 
 .
 .
 .
 
 
 
 
 Mark M. Wilde, "From Classical to Quantum Shannon Theory", arXiv:1106.1445.

Quantum mechanics
Statistical mechanics
Thermodynamic entropy
Quantum mechanical entropy